William McClure Thomson (31 December 1806, in Springdale, Ohio – 8 April 1894, in Denver, Colorado) was an American Protestant missionary working in Ottoman Syria. After spending 25 years in the area he published a best-selling description of what he had seen in his travels. He used his observations as a means of illustrating and illuminating passages from the Bible.

Career
Thomson was the son of a Presbyterian minister. He was a graduate of Miami University, Ohio.
He landed in Beirut on 24 February 1833. He was only the eighth Protestant missionary from America to arrive in the area. Two of his predecessors had died and two had been recalled. In 1834 he travelled, with his wife, to Jerusalem. In April 1834 he was in Jaffa when the Peasants' Revolt broke out and he was forced to remain there as the rebels took control of the countryside. He was unable to return to Jerusalem until Ibrahim Pasha retook it with 12,000 troops. In his absence his wife had given birth to a son but she died 12 days after Thomson's return.

Following his wife's death Thomson returned to Beirut with his son. There in 1835, with Rev. Story Hebard, he established a boarding school for boys. In August 1840 all the American missionaries in Beirut were evacuated by the USS Cyane. They witnessed the commencement of the naval bombardment of Beirut by a combined British, Austrian and Turkish fleet of 51 vessels under the command of Charles Napier. The bombardment lasted a month and resulted in the retreat of Ibrahim Pasha's army. In the same year fighting broke out between Lebanon's Druze and Maronites.  
In 1843 Thomson, with Cornelius Van Alen Van Dyck, founded a boys seminary at Abeih. There was another outbreak of violence in 1845. Thomson was involved in organising a local truce. In 1851 he moved to Sidon where he remained until 1857, when he returned to America for two years.
In 1860 full scale civil war broke out in Lebanon. The conflict lasted sixty days and spread to Damascus. Thomson supervised the distribution of £30,000 of money, food and clothing amongst the thousands of destitute refugees.

At a Beirut Mission Meeting on 23 January 1862 he proposed the establishment of a college with Daniel Bliss as its President. The Syrian Protestant College was established in 1866 with 16 students. This college was to evolve into the American University of Beirut.

Theophilus Waldmeier’s autobiography states that it was on Thomson’s advice, in 1873, that Waldmeier established Brummana High School.

His local nickname became Abu Tangera - father of the cooking pot - after his broad-rimmed hat. With his local knowledge he was used as a dragoman by several Biblical scholars. In 1852 he accompanied one of the founders of modern Biblical archeology, Edward Robinson on his second tour of the Holy Land.

The Land and the Book

In 1859 Thomson published an account of his experiences entitled The Land and the Book. Aimed at the general public rather than academics or theologians it became very popular. In America over the next forty years it was only outsold by Uncle Tom's Cabin.

The book is framed around a pilgrimage undertaken during 1857. Thomson is accompanied by an unnamed individual whose questions enable the author to recount his experiences and illustrate stories from the Bible. They set out from Beirut in January, riding South to Sidon and Tyre, from where they cut inland and arrived in Palestine via the Hula Valley. They visited Safad, Tiberias, Nazareth and Jenin before returning to the coast at Caesarea and South to Jaffa, Ashdod and Gaza. From Gaza they turned North via Bayt Jibrin, Hebron and Bethlehem, ending the journey in Jerusalem.

In his book he gives lengthy accounts of two memorable events. He was one of the first outsiders to arrive at Safad following the devastating 1837 earthquake, and in June 1839 he presided over the funeral of Lady Hester Stanhope.

The naturalist Henry Baker Tristram, author of A Natural History of the Bible, used Thomson's book as his guide during his own exploration of Palestine.

At the turn of the century, an English writer, H. Rider Haggard, covered a similar itinerary. When he landed at Haifa, his party had difficulty hiring horses due to a nationwide shortage caused by the arrival of a party of 500 Americans on a tour of the Holy Land.

Many of the illustrations in the book are by his son William Hanna Thomson.

References

1806 births
1894 deaths
American Protestant missionaries
American University of Beirut
Protestant missionaries in Syria
Holy Land travellers
American expatriates in the Ottoman Empire
Protestant missionaries in the Ottoman Empire
Protestant missionaries in Palestine (region)
Protestant missionaries in Lebanon
People from Springdale, Ohio